Mark Tyler McCumber (born April 4, 1991) is an American professional golfer who currently plays on the PGA Tour. He spent his first professional season on PGA Tour Latinoamérica. He is the son of professional golfer Mark McCumber, who was the 1988 Players Champion and a 10-time winner on the PGA Tour.

Amateur career
McCumber attended the University of Florida, where he was a member of the Florida Gators men's golf team, All American and participated in a total of 43 events during his four years, captaining the Gators golf team in his final two seasons.   During his college career, McCumber regularly finished in the top ten of events but failed to achieve a win.

Professional career
After graduating from college, McCumber turned professional in 2013 and in the same year won his first professional tournament at the Florida Open. He joined PGA Tour Latinoamérica for the 2014 season. His first win on PGA Tour Latinoamérica came at the 2014 Ecuador Open. He followed this up with his second win on the tour at the 2014 TransAmerican Power Products CRV Mazatlán Open in October. He also finished fourth at the Argentine Open, fifth at the Lexus Panama Classic and eighth at the Mundo Maya Open, earning US$86,164 and third place on the Order of Merit. As a result of his earnings, McCumber earned a promotion to the Web.com Tour for 2015.

McCumber played his first PGA Tour event at the 2018 Corales Puntacana Resort and Club Championship as a Monday qualifier. He won three times on the Mackenzie Tour in 2018 and led the tour's Order of Merit to earn a return to the Web.com Tour for 2019.

Professional wins (7)

PGA Tour Canada wins (3)

PGA Tour Latinoamérica wins (3)

Other wins (1)
 2013 Florida Open

Results in The Players Championship

"T" indicates a tie for a place

See also
2019 Korn Ferry Tour Finals graduates

References

External links
 
 

American male golfers
Florida Gators men's golfers
PGA Tour Latinoamérica golfers
PGA Tour golfers
Korn Ferry Tour graduates
Golfers from Jacksonville, Florida
People from Ponte Vedra Beach, Florida
1991 births
Living people